Cadet Rousselle is a 1954 French comedy adventure film directed by André Hunebelle and starring François Périer, Dany Robin and Madeleine Lebeau. It was shot in Eastmancolor at the Francoeur Studios in Paris and on location in Nemours, Saint-Yon and Égreville. The film's sets were designed by the art director Lucien Carré. It takes its title from a traditional song of the same title. It was a popular success in France, attracting four million spectators.

Synopsis
After a fight, cadet Rousselle is forced to leave his hometown and sets out for Paris. On the way he has several adventures, including being attacked by highwaymen. He encounters a group of touring actors who, unknown to him, are Royalist agents committed to overturning the French Revolution and he soon finds himself embroiled in danger.

Cast
 François Périer as 	Cadet Rousselle
 Dany Robin as 	Violetta Carlino
 Bourvil as Jérôme Baguindet
 Madeleine Lebeau as 	Marguerite de Beaufort
 Christine Carère as 	Isabelle
 Noël Roquevert as 	Le commissaire Berton
 Jean Parédès as Le général
 Henri Crémieux as Le maire 
 Alfred Adam as 	Ravignol
 Pierre Destailles as 	Rouget de Lisle
 Louis Arbessier as Le tribun
 Jacques Dufilho as 	Carlos
 René Génin as Le curé
 Jacques Dynam as 	L'aubergiste des Trois Grâces
 Jacques Fabbri as Le colonel
 Jean-Louis Jemma as 	Bonaparte
 Marcel Pérès as 	Martin
 Charles Bouillaud as 	Un colonel
 Louis Bugette as 	Un gardien de prison 
 Anne Carrère as 	Une invitée chez le maire
 Joé Davray as Arlequin 
 Isabelle Eber as 	L'allumeuse
 Giani Esposito as 	Monseigneur
 Françoise Favier as 	Marinette Duval -la serveuse des Trois Grâces
 Lucien Guervil as 	Le deuxième gardien de prison
 Marcelle Hainia as 	La dame en diligence
 Guy Henry as 	Atlas 
 Corinne Marchand as 	Une danseuse orientale

References

Bibliography
 Hayward, Susan. French Costume Drama of the 1950s: Fashioning Politics in Film. Intellect Books, 2010.
 Rège, Philippe. Encyclopedia of French Film Directors, Volume 1. Scarecrow Press, 2009.

External links 
 

1954 films
1954 comedy films
French comedy films
French historical films
1954 adventure films
French adventure films
1950s historical films
1950s French-language films
Films directed by André Hunebelle
Films set in the 1790s
Films set in Paris
 Pathé films
Films shot at Francoeur Studios
1950s French films